Uttlesford is a local government district in Essex, England. Its council is based in the market town of Saffron Walden. At the 2011 Census, the population of the district was 79,443. Other notable settlements include Great Dunmow, Elmdon, Stebbing, Stansted Mountfitchet, Thaxted, Debden, Little Chesterford and Felsted among other settlements.

History
Its name is derived from its location within the ancient hundred of Uttlesford, usually spelled Vdelesford  or Wdelesford  in the Domesday manuscript of 1086, possibly from Udel's ford.

The River Uttle flows from Elmdon to meet the River Cam at Wendens Ambo. There was originally a ford at Wendens Ambo on the main road immediately to the West of The Old Forge, before a bridge was constructed to the East and the road moved to its current position.

The district was formed on 1 April 1974 by the merger of the borough of Saffron Walden, Dunmow Rural District and Saffron Walden Rural District. An earlier use of the name comes from the Uttlesford Orchestra, founded in 1956, which played in and around Saffron Walden.

Economy
Apart from considerable agriculture, retail and office premises in towns, Uttlesford District includes London Stansted Airport, which is its largest employer.  For more detailed analysis of strengths and specializations in the economy see individual settlements, for instance the article: Saffron Walden.  In October 2008, the airport won a 40% increase in permitted flights under the flight cap which operates in relation to the airport, from the UK government.

Aside from countryside hotels close to and aircraft maintenance vital to Stansted Airport, airlines have also used a small adjoining business park. Titan Airways has its head office in the Enterprise House in the grounds in Stansted Mountfitchet.

Several airlines, including Buzz, AirUK (later KLM uk), AB Airlines, Go Fly had its head office at the Enterprise House. and Lloyd International Airways had their head offices on the property of Stansted Airport.

Housing
The district has the highest average house price of the 14 districts in the ceremonial county of Essex and of the 12 districts administered by Essex County Council.  To Autumn 2012, Uttlesford had the 2nd highest quarterly increase in house prices after the Borough of Basildon and 2nd highest annually after the Borough of Chelmsford, both exceeding 5%.  As a whole the county has a wide range in house prices, with Uttlesford's average house price only 0.85% greater than in Epping Forest District and 203% greater than the lowest-ranked Tendring district of Essex.

House prices were among the top 10 local authorities for resilience in having returned to or exceeded 2007 levels in a 2011 statistical analysis by The Times.

Local government

Elections

On 2 May 2019, Residents for Uttlesford won a majority with 26 councillors, but in October 2019 three members of their group defected to the Green Party to create a new council group, leaving the ruling group with 23 councillors and reducing their majority from 13 to seven seats:

The Conservatives held 31 seats in the 2011-2015 term. They retained control of the Council in the 2015 elections, but with a significantly reduced number of seats (-26%). They lost seats to Residents for Uttlesford, who then comprised the second largest party in the District. Between the 2015 and 2019 local elections, by-elections saw Residents for Uttlesford win two seats from the Liberal Democrats while the sole independent joined the Conservatives.

Energy policy
In May 2006, a report commissioned by British Gas showed that housing in Uttlesford produced the highest average carbon emissions in the country at 8,092 kg of carbon dioxide per dwelling. In response the council stated 

Uttlesford council has, however, introduced a planning permission condition requiring certain energy conservation measures to be taken when homes are extended, and has a number of other initiatives.

A 2010 study by the consultancy Altechnica indicated that all of Uttlesford's energy could come from renewable sources.

Transport

Rail 
The West Anglia Main Line passes through Uttlesford. There are stations at:

Stansted Mountfitchet
Stansted Airport
Elsenham
Newport (Essex)
Audley End (for Saffron Walden)
Great Chesterford

From all stations, there are regular services northbound towards Cambridge, operated by Greater Anglia. At certain times, trains continue towards Ely and King's Lynn. CrossCountry also operates northbound trains from Stansted Airport and Audley End to Cambridge, Peterborough, Leicester and Birmingham New Street.

From Stansted Airport, a southbound train is operated towards Bishop's Stortford, Harlow, Tottenham Hale and London Liverpool Street, operated by Greater Anglia under the Stansted Express brand. This train sometimes calls at Stansted Mountfitchet.

Greater Anglia operates southbound trains from other stations in the district to Bishop's Stortford, Harlow, Tottenham Hale and Liverpool Street. A southbound hourly fast-train also calls at Audley End, with additional services at peak times towards London from this station.

Road 
Roads in the district are managed by Essex County Council, with some routes controlled by Highways England.

The M11 motorway between London and Cambridge passes through the district, with junctions at Stansted Airport (junction 8) and Stump Cross, near Saffron Walden (9). This places the district in the M11 corridor for innovation. Northbound from Stump Cross, the A11 forms part of the northern boundary of the district, carrying traffic to Newmarket and Norwich.

The A120 runs east-west through the district between Stansted Airport and Braintree, via Great Dunmow. This connects the district to Hertford, Colchester and Harwich.

Other roads in the district are B-class roads. This includes:

 the B184 - from Stump Cross to the Rodings, via Saffron Walden, Thaxted and Great Dunmow
 the B1383 - from Stump Cross to Bishop's Stortford, via Newport and Stansted Mountfitchet
 the B1008 - from Great Dunmow to the A131 towards Chelmsford

Charity Uttlesford Community Travel  provides road transport services to the residents of Uttlesford who find it difficult to access normal public transport: they support the over 60s, the disabled and those who are rurally isolated.

Air 
Stansted Airport is in the district. Stansted is the fourth-busiest UK airport, with flights to over 200 destinations.

Bus & Coach 
There are several bus routes which cross the district and which connect the district to neighbouring destinations, including:

 Bishop's Stortford
 Braintree
 Cambridge
 Chelmsford
 Colchester
 Harlow
 Haverhill
 The Rodings

Great Dunmow and Stansted Airport are on the First Essex and Arriva Shires & Essex networks. First bus 42A calls operates from both destinations to Chelmsford, and X10 and X30 connect Stansted Airport to Chelmsford, Basildon and Southend-on-Sea. Arriva bus 133 connects Stansted and Great Dunmow to Colchester.

Arriva Bus 510 links Stansted Mountfitchet and Stansted Airport to Bishop's Stortford and Harlow.

Saffron Walden is on the Stagecoach Cambridge network, served by the Citi 7, although Megarider tickets are not valid in the district.

Stansted Airport is served by National Express and Airport Bus Express coaches to destinations in London and across the UK.

Cycling 

Several cycle routes cross the district, linking towns in the district to the National Cycle Network.

National Cycle Route 11 (NCR 11) crosses the district north-south, from Ickleton to Stansted Mountfitchet, running mostly on rural lanes. NCR 11 eventually links the district to the River Stort towpath in Bishop's Stortford (towards Harlow, NCR 1 and London). Northbound, the route continues towards Cambridge, Ely and Downham Market. A spur of the route leads into Saffron Walden, running for much of its length on a segregated cycle route.

National Cycle Route 16 runs east-west between Stansted Mountfitchet and Braintree, via Great Dunmow town centre. The route runs for much of its length on segregated cycle track, and it runs unbroken through the district, mostly parallel to the A120.

National Cycle Network 50 runs north-south between Takeley and Quendon in Uttlesford. The route ultimately runs between Quendon and Ulting (near Maldon) running entirely on country lanes.

In the media
In 2001, Uttlesford was voted as the best place to live in England, in a survey by the Sunday Times. A range of factors, including housing costs, quality of schools and low crime contributed to the overall result.  Uttlesford has also been polled as the healthiest place to live in the UK. Starting in 2001 with help from the Zoological Society of London (ZSL) a group of grey seals were raised in boyton end because of the phocine distemper virus destroying almost 50% of the grey seal population between 1988-2002 they now have a population of around 150 seals [31]

Unique features
The district is the only British local authority (excluding parishes) to begin with the letter 'u'. The only other initial letter used by only one UK local authority is 'y' for York.

The district is the only British local authority to have a branch of Pret a Manger, but no branch of Greggs.

See also
 The Hundred Parishes

References

External links
 Saffron Walden Conservatives
 Residents for Uttlesford
 Saffron Walden Liberal Democrats
 Uttlesford District Council

 
Non-metropolitan districts of Essex